Plagigeyeria is a genus of very small or minute freshwater snails with an operculum, aquatic gastropod mollusks in the family Hydrobiidae.

Species
Species within the genus Plagigeyeria include:
 Plagigeyeria conilis 
 Plagigeyeria deformata Nicolas, 1891
 Plagigeyeria edlaueri Schütt, 1961
 Plagigeyeria feheri Grego & Glöer, 2019
 Plagigeyeria gladilini Kuščer, 1937
 Plagigeyeria horatieformis (Starobogatov, 1962)
 Plagigeyeria jalzici Cindrić & Slapnik, 2019
 Plagigeyeria klemmi Schütt, 1961
 Plagigeyeria lukai Glöer & Pešić, 2014
 Plagigeyeria minuta Bole & Velkovrh, 1987
 Plagigeyeria montenigrina Bole, 1961
 Plagigeyeria mostarensis Kuščer, 1933
 Plagigeyeria necopinata A. Reischütz, Steiner-Reischütz & P.L. Reischütz, 2018
 Plagigeyeria nitida Schütt, 1963
 Plagigeyeria piroti Bole & Velkovrh, 1987
 Plagigeyeria plagiostoma A.J. Wagner, 1914
 Plagigeyeria procerula Angelov, 1965
 Plagigeyeria robusta Schütt, 1959
 Plagigeyeria steffeki Grego, Glöer, Erőss & Fehér, 2017
 Plagigeyeria tribunicae Schütt, 1963
 Plagigeyeria valvataeformis (Starobogatov, 1962)
 Plagigeyeria zetaprotogona Schütt, 1960
Species brought into synonymy
 Plagigeyeria pageti Schütt, 1961: synonym of Plagigeyeria zetaprotogona pageti Schütt, 1961 (original combination)

References

 Wagner, A. J. (1914). Höhlenschnecken aus Süddalmatien und der Hercegovina. Sitzungsberichte der kaiserlichen Akademie der Wissenschaften in Wien, mathematisch-naturwissenschaftlichen Klasse, Abt. I. 123 (1): 33-48. Wien.
 Tomlin, J.R. le B. (1930). Some preoccupied generic names. Proceedings of the Malacological Society of London. 19: 22–24.

External links
 Nomenclator Zoologicus info

 
Hydrobiidae
Taxonomy articles created by Polbot